Garrus Vakarian is a fictional character in BioWare's Mass Effect franchise, who acts as a  party member (or "squadmate") in each of the three games in the original trilogy. Garrus is a turian, one of the various alien species in Mass Effect, and is voiced by Brandon Keener.

The character is initially introduced in the first game as a C-Sec officer tired of all the rules and regulations his job includes. Come Mass Effect 2, Garrus forms a vigilante group on the crime-ridden Omega, before his team is wiped out due to betrayal. Mass Effect 3 features him advising the other turians on how to defeat the Reapers. In addition to the Mass Effect game trilogy, Garrus also appears in the third issue of Homeworlds; it tells the story of how Garrus ends up on Omega and elaborates on his backstory.

Garrus's design was altered throughout the series, though his blue-and-black colour scheme and visor were maintained in all his appearances. Developers were initially worried that Garrus, as well as the rest of the alien squadmates, would not prove emotionally compelling, but were surprised by positive fan feedback and added him as a romance option in the second game due to it. Since his appearance in Mass Effect, Garrus has received a very positive reception. Various merchandise has been made around Garrus, including action figures, a T-shirt and a bust.

Character overview
Garrus is a turian, an alien race with avian features, from a society which values discipline and possesses a strong sense of personal and collective honor. Turians resemble "humanoid birds or raptors"; they have an eagle-like head with the crest of a plumed bird, avian legs with bones jutting from their calves, and a carapace on their shoulder blades which protects them from the radiation on their homeworld Palaven. Design wise, Garrus wears a visor and has a blue-and-black theme to his armor. In Mass Effect 2, while in Omega, Garrus is seriously injured by a gunships's chain gun and rockets and so gains scars and a cracked armor.

Despite initially being introduced as a C-Sec officer, Garrus despises rules and regulations, which leads him to try to join Commander Shepard's crew and leave C-Sec. In the first game, Executor Pallin describes him as a "very good" officer albeit one with a lack of patience, while Harkin describes him as a "hothead" who "still thinks he can change the world". Despite his rash decision making, Garrus will listen to what Shepard has to say. Garrus can be influenced into being more receptive of rules and regulations, telling him that they help limit abuses of authority, or he can be encouraged to continue his loose cannon style of law-enforcement, telling him that regulations get in the way of dispensing justice.

Garrus's voice actor, Brandon Keener, blamed C-Sec's "demoralizing" bureaucracy for his reticence. Keener said that Garrus had warmed up over the course of the games, due to his interactions with the Normandy crew. David Kates, a composer who worked on the Mass Effect franchise, described Garrus as having a conscience and wanting "to do good", and that he ultimately desired for both healing and justice. Kates similarly pointed to the fact that Garrus's conversations often had a warm sense to them, often displaying a wry sense of humor as Garrus was desperately trying to "be that person".

Creation and development

Mac Walters, one of the lead writers for Mass Effect 2 and 3, acted as a senior writer for the first game and mainly focused on Garrus, as well as Wrex. Walters also wrote him in the second game, but handed him to John Dombrow for 3.

Garrus did not initially have any concept art for his armor, so associate art director Matt Rhodes created several different pieces on short notice for the team to choose from. The consensus was that Garrus would have a blue and black theme and a visor, which were later decided as important visual cues to be retained by the character for Mass Effect 2. For his scars they wanted something heroic-like and did a reference on different burns; at the same time, they didn't want a lot of red in it. In part, this was to make sure he was still recognizable as Garrus. Early iterations of Garrus' head model included a medical bandage which covers up his facial injury. Alternate appearances for customization purposes include a set of undamaged armor and a slight color variation to add a touch of uniqueness, as Garrus's default appearance following his recruitment in Omega still sees him wearing the cracked armor. In 3, the blue and black remained but silver was added; the silver was to reflect his new rank. They still wanted Garrus to look familiar, but gave him heavier armor "to withstand the battles" in Mass Effect 3 and increased the detail to his armour and eyepiece.

Garrus was voiced by Brandon Keener, who used his natural speaking voice but spoke slightly more formally; a reverb effect was then used on the voice. Voice direction was given by Ginny McSwain for individual lines. Although he does not remember exactly what happened when he started voicing Garrus, Keener believes he was given some background information, personality traits and character sketches before voicing the character.

Garrus was not initially given a romance in the first game as the developers were unsure whether the alien characters would be emotionally compelling. However, a romance was added in the second game due to popular demand, though the developers were still surprised at its popularity once the game was released.

When designing the music for 2s "Garrus level", David Kates had a fun time working with the character. Kates wanted to bring the sense of conflict he felt between his desire for healing and justice to the music, as well bring a "human element" and a bit of emotion to Garrus, giving the impression he was motivated by more than just the battle. Kates compared his chord vocabulary for Garrus' level to Wendy Carlos' language in Tron.

Appearances

In video games

Mass Effect
Garrus first appeared in the 2007 Mass Effect, as a squadmate. After the first mission, the player encounters his case against Saren being dropped by C-Sec officials, despite Garrus's objections. Garrus decides to continue working on the case anyway, and can be found in the Med Clinic after speaking to Harkin. If the player goes to the Med Clinic, they will encounter Dr. Chloe Michel being threatened by thugs, who Garrus will shoot after Shepard distracts them. If the player does not go to the Med Clinic but recruits Wrex, Garrus will appear later and ask to join the Normandy's crew; however, the player may refuse him, and thus go through the game without him. If the player does recruit him, Garrus can be found in the Normandy and be talked with after each main mission for new information about himself. If the player continues doing this, Garrus will eventually tell Shepard of Dr. Saleon, a salarian geneticist using his employees as test tubes to grow spare organs in who escaped from Garrus long ago; the player may then choose to hunt down Saleon and take him out.

Mass Effect 2
Garrus then returns in Mass Effect 2, regardless of whether he was recruited in the first game. After the player arrives at Omega and begins the mission to recruit Archangel, they discover he is currently under attack by all of the mercenary groups on the station and that they must rescue him. When they reach him, Archangel takes off his helmet and reveals himself to be Garrus. At the end of the mission, Garrus is shot by the gunship's mass accelerator cannons and receives scars; Garrus can then be found in the Normandy and talked to for information, as well as brought out for missions as a squad member. If the player continues to talk with Garrus, he will reveal he has new information on Sidonis – the turian who betrayed Garrus's original team fighting the mercenaries on Omega, leading to all of their deaths. The player can then choose to help Garrus find Sidonis and help him kill him, or, after seeing that Sidonis is now immensely regretful for his actions and depressed, convince Garrus to spare his life. Alternatively, the player can just not do the mission. After this mission is completed and if the player is playing a female Shepard, they may pursue a romance with the character. During the last mission of the game, various members of the squad can end up killed, Garrus included; Garrus's likelihood of dying increases if the Sidonis mission is not done.

Mass Effect 3
Unless a save was imported from 2 where Garrus died, he will appear again as a squadmate in Mass Effect 3. After the events of 2, Garrus is revealed to have contacted his father and told him about the Reaper threat; his father proceeded to lobby for more defences to be made to prepare for them, which resulted Garrus being put in charge of a "Reaper task force". After the player begins the mission on the turian planet Palaven's moon to find Primarch Fedorian, they encounter Garrus advising the turians on how to defeat the attacking Reapers. Garrus joins the squad, and can from then on be found in the Normandy talking to other crew members and interacted with. Like the second game, a female Shepard may pursue a romance with him, but the romance requires an imported save where Garrus was romanced in 2.

Mass Effect: Andromeda
While Garrus does not physically appear in Mass Effect: Andromeda, he is referenced briefly in passing. Through a sidequest, the player can unlock Alec Ryder's encrypted memories and observe a conversation between Alec Ryder and Castis Vakarian. During the conversation, Castis references his son's adventures with Commander Shepard and expresses his concern that the Reapers may indeed be a real threat.

In other media

Mass Effect: Homeworlds
Garrus is the focus of Mass Effect: Homeworlds third issue, a comic series dedicated to starring a different Mass Effect 3 squadmate in each issue.

Reception
 

Garrus has received near-universal acclaim from both critics and fans. Out of all the squadmates in the Mass Effect series, he has been particularly highlighted as a fan favorite who is consistently placed at the top of several reader's polls and critic rankings. Robert Purchase observed that Garrus' character arc is firmly defined by his relationship with Shepard, and claimed that he could "write a whole character study on why Garrus is clearly your best buddy throughout the trilogy". Rowan Kaiser from Unwinnable asserted that "more than any single component of Mass Effect, Garrus embodies the tone, theme and characterization of the series."

According to game statistics for Mass Effect 2, Garrus was one of the most commonly selected characters for the squad. Steven Hopper from IGN selected Garrus as his top teammate in the series. UGO's IGN's GamesRadar listed him as one of several characters that sequels vastly improved, comparing his first appearance as to a comic book character's humble origin story and noting him in his second appearance as a "total unapologetic badass". On the other hand, Jeremy Parish from 1UP.com criticised his personality shift between the first game and the second game, noting that his character suffered the most from Mass Effect 2s over-"edginess", particularly as his darkening was detriment to the Paragon choice of nudging him towards rules in the first game. Garrus has been called "iconic" and "more than just another squadmate" in US Gamer's retrospective feature in commemoration of the 10th year anniversary of Mass Effect 2.

Game statistics released by BioWare for Mass Effect 3 revealed that Garrus was the second most popular Mass Effect 3 squad member with 23.8% of its player base, after Liara T'Soni. Sal Basile named him the third best squadmate in Mass Effect 3, noting that he made a good counterpart to Shepard. In a 2016 article, PC Gamer ranked Garrus the best companion of the Mass Effect series. PC Gamer staff said "Garrus is something else. He's your best pal, first and foremost, somebody whose objectives and attitude align with your own and who will always, always have your back. The journey from that first meeting between a frustrated C-Sec officer and a novice Spectre during the Saren investigation to that last charge against the Reapers as a pair of war heroes is one of the best friendship stories in gaming. Green Man Gaming included Garrus in their top 5 list of the best characters from the Mass Effect franchise.

The potential romance to Garrus has generated substantial fan interest. Writing for IGN, Emma Boynes listed the relationship between a female Shepard and him as one of the best in video gaming; and noted that while he seemed an odd choice at first, he "grows on you". In a list of seven game characters who the staff "(seriously) fell in love with", Gamesradar listed him as number 1; Holland Cooper praised his calm voice, loyalty to Shepard, and "pure charisma". A reader's poll ranking the best and worst of Mass Effect games published by PC Gamer in 2015 reveal that Garrus is the sixth most popular love interest, the most popular heterosexual romance option for a female Shepard, and was overall the most popular Mass Effect character. In a 2016 article written for The Guardian, Kate Gray and Holly Nielsen reflected on the Garrus romance scene in Mass Effect 2, and concluded that "the appeal of this scene is in the way he brings wine and puts on music in an attempt to make things nice; it’s in his obvious nervousness and the way he eventually lets his guard down". Michael Graff from Screenrant dissented and ranked the Garrus romance scene as one of the Mass Effect series' most cringe-inducing moments.

Outside of the Mass Effect series, Garrus is considered one of the franchise's most recognizable characters. Garrus has been listed by GamesRadar ranked 15 out of 100 of their best video gaming heroes; GamesRadar also saying they preferred him to Shepard themself. Cooper, again, listed him as their top badass in gaming for this generation. Lorenzo Veloria, also from GamesRadar, called him one of his favourite RPG party members. GamesRadar included him in a list of "11 video game characters that would take home Olympic gold", citing his shooting abilities. Writing for The Observer, Tom Chatfield listed Garrus as one of his favourite 10 video game characters. Game Informers Kimberley Wallace considered him to be one of the best BioWare characters, commenting that "Garrus has enough charisma to top all the rest of the Mass Effect cast." A reader's poll published by IGN in December 2014 for their top ultimate RPG party choices drawing from characters of several disparate RPG video game franchises, placed Garrus as the top choice. Gamestm named Garrus one of BioWare’s 8 most memorable companion characters, and Garrus topped App Trigger's list of the 10 Best BioWare Companions. Phil Savage from PC Gamer named Garrus as his personal favorite Bioware companion, commenting that Mass Effect 3 was a game with many endings, and Garrus's ending "takes place before the final battle, shooting cans with Shepard at the top of the Citadel's Presidium. It's a scene laced with humour, rivalry, sadness and, yes, friendship. The best way to remember BioWare's best companion."

Promotion and merchandise
As with many of the other squadmates, various merchandise has been made for Garrus. These include two action figures (one of which is designed as a "collectible"), a screenprint poster, a t-shirt, a character key, and a bust. In addition, several fans have made their own items such as plushies and T-shirts; but these are all unofficial. Keener agreed to record a voice mail message as part of a Mass Effect-themed silent auction for Child's Play.

To commemorate the release of Mass Effect Legendary Edition'' in May 2021, two variant editions of a statue made with polyresin material in the likeness of Garrus were released in mid-2021.

Further reading

References

Extraterrestrial characters in video games
Fictional characters with disfigurements
Fictional humanoids
Fictional marksmen and snipers
Fictional police detectives
Fictional police officers in video games
Fictional soldiers in video games
Fictional sole survivors
Fictional special forces personnel
Male characters in video games
Mass Effect characters
Video game characters introduced in 2007
Video game sidekicks
Vigilante characters in video games